Tropical Storm Pakhar, known in the Philippines as Tropical Storm Jolina, was a strong tropical storm that impacted South China during late August 2017. This storm followed Typhoon Hato which affected the area a few days prior. Pakhar was the fourteenth named storm of the Pacific typhoon season. Pakhar developed from a tropical depression to the east of Luzon during August 24, and intensified into a tropical storm later that day. Pakhar made landfall over in Aurora on August 25. Pakhar gradually intensified and peaked as a severe tropical storm by August 27, making landfall over Taishan, Jiangmen in Southern China.

Meteorological history

The next day, the Japan Meteorological Agency (JMA) classified the system as a weak tropical depression, while the JTWC issued a Tropical Cyclone Formation Alert (TCFA). By 15:00 UTC of the same day, the JTWC had upgraded the system to a tropical depression, assigning the numerical designation 16W. Three hours later, the JMA tracked that 16W had already strengthened into a tropical storm, giving 16W the name Pakhar. Around the same time, the PAGASA began issuing advisories under the local name Jolina. After it was depicted by satellite imagery that there were deep convection obscuring its low-level circulation center (LLCC), the JTWC had upgraded the system to a tropical storm.

By August 25, Pakhar slightly intensified after convective banding wrapping to its LLCC was depicted by imagery. Pakhar slightly intensified after a burst of deep convection developed just prior of making landfall over in Luzon in the province of Aurora. However, due to land reaction from the archipelago and the inclusion of a weakened convective structure, Pakhar weakened to minimal tropical storm intensity.

After emerging to the South China Sea on August 26, Pakhar began to re-intensify as the storm entered in an area of a much lower amount of wind shear. However six hours later, Pakhar maintained its intensity after its LLCC became exposed and its deep convective banding became fragmented. By 18:00 UTC of the same day, the JMA upgraded Pakhar's intensity as a severe tropical storm, despite its central convection remaining disorganized. The PAGASA also stated that the storm had already exited their area of responsibility, issuing its final bulletin on Pakhar. Three hours later, the JTWC issued their final advisory. By 06:00 UTC, Pakhar began to rapidly weaken as the JMA downgraded Pakhar to a tropical storm. The JMA tracked the system until 18:00 UTC of the same day when it fully dissipated.

Preparations and impact

Philippines

Tropical Storm Pakhar was locally named as Jolina within the country by PAGASA. As soon as the PAGASA began issuing advisories on the storm, Tropical Cyclone Warning Signal#1 was raised over most of Cagayan Valley and northern Aurora during August 24. Tropical Cyclone Warning Signal #2 was also raised in the same areas with the inclusion of the Cordillera Administrative Region while Signal #1 was extended to the Ilocos Region and Bicol Region. By August 25, a total of 16 provinces were placed in a warning as they were located within a  radius of the storm. Classes were suspended for all levels over in Albay, Bicol due to possible threats of flooding and landslides on August 25. The government also announced the suspension of classes for August 26 over in Metro Manila and some parts of Central Luzon and Calabarzon. The province of Ilocos Sur declared the suspension of work in all public and private services that same day.

The Office of the Civil Defense warned residents of low-lying areas in the provinces of Cagayan and Isabela of potential flooding. Kennon Road in Benguet were closed due to the threat of landslides. Hiking, trekking, and caving were suspended over in mountainous areas in the Mountain Province. Heavy rainfall from Pakhar caused the Magat Dam to overflow, which also submerged several bridges over in Isabela. A total of 11 flights to Hong Kong and South China from Ninoy Aquino International Airport were canceled due to the storm. Eight domestic flights were canceled throughout August 25.

According to the National Disaster Risk Reduction and Management Council, 3,397 people were affected by the storm with 17 reports of flooding. The cities of Balatan, San Fernando and Ifugao suffered power outages throughout the storm. Overall, no casualties have been reported and damages were relatively minor. Recorded damages in Aurora province have reached PH₱41.27 million (US$808 thousand).

Hong Kong, Macau and South China
Still recovering from the aftermath of Typhoon Hato which impacted the area four days earlier, the Macao Meteorological and Geophysical Bureau issued a Tropical cyclone signal No. 8 for Macau late on August 26, as the storm approached. An orange typhoon warning was also raised over in the provinces of Shenzhen and Guangzhou while red warning was raised in Zhuhai. A total of 206 flights were cancelled and another 471 delayed while 44 flights had to divert, including roughly 300 flights in total in Hong Kong being either cancelled or delayed, with 30 others diverted. There were 13 reports of flooding and 159 fallen trees over in Hong Kong. Two people were stranded in Kowloon Peak and moreover, the Government Flying Service deployed a Challenger 604 fixed-wing plane to locate 11 crew members waiting in the control room of a sinking Hong Tai 176 vessel.

A total of 9,000 emergency repairers, 97 emergency generator vehicles and 1,691 generators are in place in Guangxi and the Yangtze River flood control headquarters dispatched personnel for the provinces of Sichuan and Yunnan.

Around 1:00 p.m local time, both the Macau and Hong Kong Observatory lowered their signal to a Tropical cyclone signal No. 3, but it wasn't until 10:10 p.m local time when all signals were down. The Home Affairs Department of Hong Kong opened 27 temporary shelters while the China Ferry Terminal in Tsim Sha Tsui was closed temporarily. Ferry services across the Pearl River Delta were also suspended. Part of the Stonecutters Bridge was closed due to strong winds which made vehicles taller than 1.5 metres and motorcycles barred from using the bridge. Moreover, 51 people sought medical treatment in public hospitals and 231 people have sought refuge in shelters.

An orange typhoon warning was also raised over in the provinces of Shenzhen and Guangzhou while red warning was raised in Zhuhai. Furthermore, Hainan had a total of 24,124 fishing boats put into harbor. All of the water bus service was paused in Pearl River Delta.
A total of 9,000 emergency repairers, 97 emergency generator vehicles and 1,691 generators are in place in Guangxi and the Yangtze River flood control headquarters dispatched personnel for the provinces of Sichuan and Yunnan.

A total of 83,000 people were affected by the storm, along with 14,000 people in which were evacuated over in the four main affected regions of Guandong, Guangxi, Guizhou and Yunnan. One person died from a traffic incident while 62 were injured, while an additional two were confirmed hours later. Overall, 12 people were killed by Pakhar, and damages have reached CN¥760 million (US$114.4 million).

Elsewhere
The remnants of Pakhar caused heavy rainfall in Bắc Kạn Province, Vietnam. It cost 2 billion₫ (US$88,000) in damage. Pakhar brought extreme rainfall over in some parts of Thailand despite it not having any direct impact. Due to the torrential rain, a major reservoir in Sakon Nakhon had to be discharged, leading to a flood watch being issued in the northern parts of the country on August 28. The Nam Pung Dam also carried about 170 million cubic meters of water, about 3% over its usual holding capacity.

See also

Weather of 2017
Tropical cyclones in 2017
 Other systems named Pakhar
 Tropical Storm Nida (2016)
 Tropical Storm Linfa (2015)
 Tropical Storm Soudelor (2009)

References

External links

 JMA General Information of Severe Tropical Storm Pakhar (1714) from Digital Typhoon

 16W.PAKHAR from the U.S. Naval Research Laboratory
 South China Morning Post Topic : Typhoon Hato

2017 disasters in China
2017 disasters in the Philippines
2017 in Hong Kong
2017 Pacific typhoon season
August 2017 events in China
August 2017 events in the Philippines
Typhoons in China
Typhoons in Hong Kong
Typhoons in the Philippines
Pakhar